Raki Aouani (born 11 September 2004) is a Tunisian professional footballer who plays as a forward for Étoile du Sahel.

Club career
Aouani is seen as one of the best young talents in Tunisia.

International career
Aouani has represented Tunisia at under-20 level.

Career statistics

Club

Notes

References

2004 births
Living people
Tunisian footballers
Tunisia youth international footballers
Association football forwards
Tunisian Ligue Professionnelle 1 players
Étoile Sportive du Sahel players